A Little Late with Lilly Singh is an American late-night talk show that was broadcast by NBC. Premiering on September 16, 2019, and hosted by Canadian comedian and internet celebrity Lilly Singh, it succeeded Last Call with Carson Daly as the third and final original program of NBC's late-night lineup, airing at 1:37 a.m. ET/PT.

The show originally used a studio-based format similar to other late-night talk shows, albeit with its episodes being filmed in advance rather than the same day they air, and therefore having a reduced focus on current events. For its second season, the show was retooled with new production staff, and began to be filmed in a Los Angeles home rather than live-to-tape. Singh became the first openly bisexual person, as well as the first person of Indian and South Asian descent, to host an American broadcast major network late-night talk show.

A Little Late was canceled by NBC on May 6, 2021, with its final episode airing on June 3, 2021, and its timeslot being given back to affiliates.

History
Last Call with Carson Daly aired on NBC since 2002 as the third and final original program of the network's late-night lineup, behind Late Night and The Tonight Show. It was initially formatted as a studio-based talk show, but was later retooled to consist of interview and performance segments filmed on-location. When Daly was announced as the new social media correspondent for Today in 2013, it was stated that Daly would be moving from Last Call to the show. However, Daly would remain as host in a reduced capacity, only providing introductions between the segments. On February 12, 2019, NBC announced that Last Call would conclude after its 2,000th and final episode, with Daly citing his desire to focus on Today, The Voice, and other new projects (including a planned series for Golf Channel).

NBC stated that it intended to replace Last Call with a new program. NBC's co-chairman of entertainment George Cheeks intended the timeslot to become a "creative playground" for a personality who could be positioned as a "digital" and "relevancy" play, as opposed to a "ratings play". Chrissy Teigen was suggested as a possibility, but she declined. Former Late Night with Conan O'Brien producer John Irwin suggested YouTube celebrity Lilly Singh—noting her ability to perform both serious interviews and comedic material. The Hollywood Reporter also noted that Singh's experience with online video would also bolster the program's digital presence.

On March 14, 2019, NBC officially announced A Little Late with Lilly Singh. That night, Singh appeared on The Tonight Show Starring Jimmy Fallon to promote the upcoming series. Singh became the first woman among the current generation of late-night hosts on the major broadcast networks, and the first late-night host to ever publicly identify as bisexual. The series was executive produced by Singh and her business partner Polly Auritt (head of development for Singh's studio Unicorn Island Productions), along with John Irwin and others. Aliyah Silverstein was named showrunner.

The show maintained its own YouTube channel, featuring highlights as well as other web-exclusive content. Cheeks explained that the network did not mind if viewers discovered the series via its YouTube content rather on TV (clips of segments from late-night talk shows, including Fallon's Tonight Show in particular, have been major draws on YouTube). Singh thought of each episode "[having] a life for the next 24 hours" after their television premiere, and told her writing staff that pitches had to be in the form of "the YouTube video title that's going to work with it".

The network agreed to accommodate Singh's other ventures and entertainment projects, primarily by having her pre-record the first season in advance (as opposed to other late-night programs, where episodes are typically filmed the same day as they are broadcast). The first season of 97 episodes was filmed over a three-month span in late-2019.

Due to this filming schedule, A Little Late was one of the only late-night talk shows to still air studio-based first-run episodes at the onset of the COVID-19 pandemic in the United States (which prompted all other shows to suspend production or move to remotely-produced formats). Singh remarked that viewers were raising concerns over the episodes on social media, as they were unaware that they had been filmed "back in 2019 when the only people wearing masks were robbers and Jim Carrey."

On May 13, 2020, NBC renewed the show for a second season. On December 1, 2020, it was announced that season 2 would premiere on January 11, 2021. Several production changes were made for the second season, including the addition of a new showrunner and writing staff, and having Singh film the program at a home in Los Angeles rather than a traditional studio set.

On May 6, 2021, NBC announced that A Little Late would end after two seasons, with Singh signing a first-look deal with Universal Television Alternative Studio to produce other new unscripted projects for the company, and NBC opting to "move away" from scheduling original programming in the time slot.

Format 
The series featured a mix of interviews, comedy sketches, and commentary "rants". In contrast to other late-night talk shows, the first season of A Little Late largely avoided topical content (such as news satire), citing its filming schedule, and larger focus on comedy and Singh's personal experiences rather than "current information".

The first season used a studio set similar to other late-night talk shows. For the second season, A Little Late began to use a house in the Los Angeles area as its studio, with a small crew present on-site, and began to increase its use of topical commentaries (with subjects having included new U.S. vice president Kamala Harris, and the Proud Boys). While the COVID-19 pandemic was cited as having influenced the decision, Singh explained to Deadline Hollywood that she felt uncomfortable in a studio (describing it as a "creative crutch"), and the new setting allowed her to give the show a "more inviting and warm casual" feel (including more "behind the scenes" moments, and not having to film the show live-to-tape). Singh also began to write more of her own material for sketches. Of the changes, Singh sarcastically remarked during the season premiere that filming without an audience "sounds a lot like YouTube and I don’t know if I have enough experience."

Broadcast
A Little Late premiered on September 16, 2019, featuring actress Mindy Kaling as its first guest. The episode was made available on A Little Lates YouTube channel at 10:00 p.m. ET, in advance of its television premiere. An hour-long primetime special aired on September 18, 2019, following the season 14 finale of America's Got Talent, with guests Christina Aguilera, Tony Hale, Mandy Moore, Kenan Thompson, Milo Ventimiglia, and 5 Seconds of Summer. While an expected appearance by Canadian prime minister Justin Trudeau was promoted by NBC, it was cut prior to broadcast.

In Singh's home country of Canada, A Little Late was acquired by Global. It aired as a lead-out for The Late Show with Stephen Colbert—airing an hour earlier (12:35 a.m. ET/PT) in the Eastern and Pacific time zones than its U.S. scheduling.

In February 2021, NBC announced that reruns of A Little Late would be replaced temporarily on Friday nights by airings of Peacock's The Amber Ruffin Show.

The show remained in reruns after its final episode until August 13, 2021; the next Monday, the half-hour was given over to affiliates, either for a repeat of their late local newscasts, other programming, or a network-provided replay of the NBC Nightly News.

Reception 

The review aggregator website Rotten Tomatoes reported that the first season of A Little Late with Lilly Singh holds an 82% critic approval rating based on 11 reviews, with an average rating of 6 out of 10. The site's critical consensus reads: "The delightful Lilly Singh breathes fresh air into the world of late-night comedy with an energetic new show that's willing to play with the format in ways that will keep viewers looking forward to staying up A Little Late." Metacritic reports a weighted average score of 62 out of 100, based on 4 critic reviews, indicating "generally favorable reviews."

The premiere episode attained steady ratings in comparison to the finale of Last Call. In October 2019, it was reported that the series had an average of 666,000 viewers for the early portion of fall 2019 and a 0.16 rating in adults 18–49 per episode, which were below those of Last Call for the same period (780,000) from a year prior. In May 2020, The Hollywood Reporter characterized the first season's ratings to have been "comparable" to that of Last Call, and that the show led all first-year shows in 2019–20 in online social engagements.

In a positive review, Shirley Li from The Atlantic opined that while Singh's monologues came off "awkward" she excelled in interviewing the series' guests, during which she delivered "some of her best, off-the-cuff humor." Caroline Framke of Variety also gave the series a positive review and commended Singh as an "engaged interviewer capable of steering the conversation where it needs to go." In addition, the segment "Lilly Is Struggling to Date Women" was nominated for Outstanding Variety or Talk Show Episode at the 31st GLAAD Media Awards. "Lilly Responds to Comments About Her Sexuality" was nominated and won the same award at the 32nd GLAAD Media Awards. The show was also nominated for an MTV Movie & TV Award, for Best Talk/Topical Show, and a Canadian Screen Award, for Singh as host.

Awards and nominations

Episodes

Season 1: 2019–2020

September 2019

October 2019

November 2019

December 2019

January 2020

February 2020

March 2020

April 2020

May 2020

Season 2: 2021

January 2021

February 2021

March 2021

April 2021

May 2021

June 2021

References

External links 
 
 
 

2019 American television series debuts
2021 American television series endings
2010s American late-night television series
2010s American television talk shows
2020s American late-night television series
2020s American television talk shows
English-language television shows
NBC late-night programming
NBC original programming
Television series by Universal Television